The Federal Correctional Institution, Marianna (FCI Marianna) is a medium-security United States federal prison for male inmates in Marianna, Florida. It is operated by the Federal Bureau of Prisons, a division of the United States Department of Justice. The facility also includes an adjacent satellite prison camp for minimum-security female offenders. It lies adjacent to the Marianna Municipal Airport.

Notable incidents
In 2012, several dozen federal correctional officers who supervised inmates involved in a computer recycling program at FCI Marianna filed a lawsuit against the Federal Bureau of Prisons and its prison-owned industry, UNICOR, seeking compensation for illnesses and resulting quality-of-life losses they say they suffered from exposure to toxic dust generated in the process of recycling computers, which have components containing lead, cadmium, beryllium, mercury and possibly other toxic substances. The officers further allege that the Federal Bureau of Prisons failed to ensure that the program was being operated safely and did not have the proper safety measures in place. They had previously filed administrative claims in their case, but those were denied late last year. Having exhausted their options on the administrative pathway, the officers were then free to file the suit. Some inmates are also in the process of seeking remedy.

Also in 2012, two correction officers at FCI Marianna, Steven M. Smith, 28, and Mary S. Summers, 30, were charged with smuggling contraband, including marijuana, cellular telephones and tobacco, into the prison and to delivering it to inmates in exchange for cash payments. They subsequently pleaded guilty and were sentenced to prison.

Notable Inmates (Current and Former)

See also
List of U.S. federal prisons
Federal Bureau of Prisons
Incarceration in the United States

References

External links
Federal Correctional Institution, Marianna  – Official website

Marianna
Marianna
Buildings and structures in Jackson County, Florida